Bousbecque is a commune in the Nord department in northern France.

Population

Heraldry

See also
 Communes of the Nord department
 Ogier Ghiselin de Busbecq

References

Communes of Nord (French department)
French Flanders